Andrei Socaci (born 19 June 1966) is a retired Romanian weightlifter. After winning a silver medal at the 1984 Olympics as a lightweight he moved up to the middleweight division and won nine medals at the world and European championships between 1985 and 1992, including the European title in 1991. After retiring from competition he stayed as a coach with his last club CS Dinamo București.

References

External links 

 
 
 

1966 births
Living people
Olympic weightlifters of Romania
Weightlifters at the 1984 Summer Olympics
Weightlifters at the 1988 Summer Olympics
Olympic silver medalists for Romania
Olympic medalists in weightlifting
Medalists at the 1984 Summer Olympics
European Weightlifting Championships medalists
World Weightlifting Championships medalists
Romanian male weightlifters
20th-century Romanian people
21st-century Romanian people